Gianluca D'Auria (born 28 October 1996) is an Italian professional footballer who plays as a winger for  club Imolese.

Club career
On 12 January 2023, D'Auria joined Imolese.

References

External links

1996 births
Living people
Footballers from Naples
Italian footballers
Association football forwards
Serie C players
Serie D players
Inter Milan players
S.S.C. Napoli players
A.S.D. Francavilla players
S.S. Monopoli 1966 players
S.S.D. Lucchese 1905 players
S.S. Juve Stabia players
A.C.N. Siena 1904 players
Carrarese Calcio players
Imolese Calcio 1919 players